Francis Cheka (born Francis Boniface Cheka on April 15, 1982 in Dar es Salaam, Tanzania) is a Tanzanian professional boxer and the current World Boxing Federation (WBF) Super Middleweight Champion. Cheka resides in Morogoro, Tanzania.

See also 
 Bruno Tarimo
 Goodluck Mrema
 Rashid Matumla

References

External links 
 

|-

|-

|-

|-

1982 births
Living people
People from Dar es Salaam
Super-middleweight boxers
Tanzanian male boxers